The 2016 Pittsburgh Panthers football team represented the University of Pittsburgh in the 2016 NCAA Division I FBS football season. The Panthers were led by second-year head coach Pat Narduzzi and played their home games at Heinz Field. They were a member of the Coastal Division of the Atlantic Coast Conference (ACC). The season marked Pitt's fourth season as a member of the ACC. The Panthers finished the season 8–5, 5–3 in ACC play to finish in a three-way tie for second place in the Coastal Division. The Panthers received an invitation to the Pinstripe Bowl at Yankee Stadium where they lost to Northwestern 31–24.

On September 10, 2016, the Panthers played their in-state rivals Penn State for the first time since 2000, where they were victorious, 42–39. Penn State had won seven of the previous eight games between the two schools.

Previous season

The Panthers finished the 2015 season 8–5, 6–2 in ACC play to finish in second place in the Coastal division. They were invited to play in the Military Bowl, where they were defeated by Navy 44–28.

The Panthers saw success despite losing ACC Player of the Year James Conner early in the season to a torn MCL. Conner announced in December that he had been diagnosed with Hodgkin's lymphoma, a form of cancer. On May 23, Conner announced on Twitter that he had been declared cancer-free. He had been participating in spring practices despite undergoing treatments for his condition.

Offseason

2016 NFL draft

NFL undrafted free agents

Recruiting class

Injuries
It was announced that several players would be missing for the upcoming season due to injury. Sophomore tight end Chris Clark underwent knee surgery, while redshirt sophomore offensive lineman Mike Grimm underwent hip surgery; both missed the entire 2016 season. Junior defensive tackle Justin Moody was forced to retire due to a non-football-related cervical spine condition; he remained on the team as a student assistant. Additionally, incoming recruits Zack Gilbert and George Hill, both suffering from heart conditions, also missed the 2016 season.

Schedule
The Panthers schedule was released on January 26, 2016. The blue team defeated the gold team, 19–17, in the spring game on Saturday April 16, 2016 at Heinz Field.

Game summaries

Villanova

The Panthers opened the 2016 season against an FCS opponent in Villanova.

The Wildcats controlled play for portions of the first half, but three straight drives into Pitt territory failed to produce any points, giving the Panthers time to get going. Running back James Conner, having missed the entire 2015 season due to a torn MCL and after having battled Hodgkin's lymphoma in the off-season, returned to the field and scored 2 touchdowns in the 2nd quarter. The first came on a 3-yard run; the second came on a 9-yard pass from Nathan Peterman. Quadree Henderson returned the second-half kickoff 96 yards for a score to break things open. Rob Rolle returned a Peterman fumble 3 yards for a touchdown in the third quarter for Villanova's only score. Peterman completed 19 of 32 passes for 175 yards and two touchdowns, including a pretty 16-yard touchdown pass to Jester Weah in the 4th quarter. The Panthers managed just 261 total yards. Defensively, the Panthers only allowed 172 yards and forced 2 turnovers, including a Terrish Webb interception.

Dewayne Hendrix and Elijah Zeise were injured during the game; their injuries were initially thought to be not serious, but it was later announced after the Penn State game the following week that both would miss the remainder of the season.

Penn State

Following their victory over Villanova, the Panthers would host in-state rival Penn State. The two schools hadn't played each other since the 2000 season, where Pitt shut out the Nittany Lions 12–0 at the old Three Rivers Stadium.

The Panthers jumped out to a 28–7 lead in the first half behind a powerful rushing attack, spearheaded by James Conner. George Aston struck first with a 1-yard touchdown run to give Pitt the lead 7–0. The Panthers scored again on their very next possession on a 7-yard touchdown pass from Nathan Peterman to Quadree Henderson, swelling the lead to 14–0. A 3-yard Saquon Barkley touchdown run cut the Pitt lead to 7 before the end of the 1st quarter.

The Panthers scored on the first possession of the 2nd quarter on a 2yard touchdown pass from Peterman to Scott Orndoff. They would add to their lead the very next drive with a George Aston 3-yard touchdown run, putting the lead at 28–7. Just before the end of the half, Saquon Barkley again scored a touchdown for the Nittany Lions, this time from 1 yard out, to pull Penn State within 2 scores at the half.

Penn State would score on their first possession of the second half on a 40-yard touchdown pass from Trace McSorley to Saquon Barkley to cut the Pittsburgh lead to a touchdown, 28–21. The Panthers would respond with an 11 play, 75-yard drive, capped off with a 1-yard touchdown run from James Conner. On the following Penn State possession, Dennis Briggs would force Saquon Barkley to fumble the ball, which would be recovered by the Panthers at their own 35-yard line. The offense would fail to capitalize on the turnover, as Chris Blewitt would miss a 50-yard field goal.

Following the missed field goal, the Nittany Lions went to work in the 4th quarter, scoring on the first possession on a Saquon Barkley 1-yard touchdown run, putting the score at 35–28, Pitt. The Panthers would shoot themselves in the foot on the next possession, as James Conner fumbled the ball deep in Pittsburgh territory, giving Penn State favorable field position at the PITT 11 yard line. However, the defense would hold strong in spite of this, holding Penn State to a field goal and not allowing them to tie the game. Early in the 4th quarter, Pitt clung to a 35–31 lead. On the ensuing kickoff, Quadree Henderson would return the ball 84-yards to the Penn State 10-yard line, where a few plays later, Nathan Peterman would shovel pass the ball to James Conner, who would take it into the end zone from 12-yards out, giving the Panthers a 2 score lead once again, 42–31. After trading possessions, Penn State would close the gap to 3 when, again, Saquon Barkley scored on a 3-yard touchdown run. Trace McSorley would connect with DaeSean Hamilton on the 2-point conversion, put the score at 42–39, Pitt, with 5 minutes remaining in the game. After a Pittsburgh 3-and-out, Penn State would receive the ball with under 4 minutes left in the game at their own 29-yard line. They would drive the ball all the way to the PITT 31 yard line before Senior cornerback Ryan Lewis picked off Trace McSorley in the end zone with just over a minute to play, ensuring a 42–39 victory for Pitt.

Saquon Barkley accounted for all 5 of Penn State's touchdowns and James Conner ran for 117 yards and a touchdown and caught another; as a team, the Panthers rushed for 359 yards. The game was also played in front of the largest crowd in the history of the city of Pittsburgh to watch a sporting event (69,983). The Panthers moved to 2–0 on the season, renewing a heated in-state rivalry in the process.

at Oklahoma State

at North Carolina

Mitchell Trubisky kept scanning the field, delivering the ball on target with a cool composure for North Carolina down to when he made the game's biggest play in the frantic final seconds. The junior threw a 2-yard touchdown pass to Bug Howard with 2 seconds left to help the Tar Heels rally past Pittsburgh 37–36 on Saturday in the Atlantic Coast Conference opener for two teams that finished 1–2 atop the Coastal Division last season. "We had talked about before the game that we had an opportunity to establish the identity of this football team", UNC coach Larry Fedora said. And I can say there's a lot of grit in this football team for one, a lot of toughness all the intangibles that we need to be successful. Trubisky threw for career highs of 453 yards and five touchdowns for the Tar Heels (3–1, 1–0 ACC). His main target was Ryan Switzer, who tied a program record with 16 catches for 208 yards and a score.

The Tar Heels never led until the final play and trailed by 13 with 6 minutes left. But Trubisky led a 17-play, 63-yard drive that included three fourth-down conversions in a stunning finish, sending UNC's players running onto the field to celebrate once they stopped Pitt's final-play kick return. Everybody believed, man, Howard said. "We had some fans leaving and stuff, people was giving up on us after they scored that last touchdown. But the defense had our back, we had their back, we told them if they'd get one more stop, we're going to make it happen." Quadree Henderson ran for 107 yards to for the Panthers (2–2, 0–1), who ran for 281 yards but went three-and-out on their last two drives to give UNC its opening.
"When something like that (comeback) happens, you have to look at yourself first: Did I do everything I needed to do to get us a victory?" Pitt defensive end Ejuan Price said. "I think that answer is no."
Simply put, the Panthers have to get better against the pass. Dating to last week's loss at Oklahoma State, Pitt has surrendered 993 yards through the air couldn't get a stop late, even as coach Pat Narduzzi said he thought the team was "a lot sounder" this week. "I thought our coaches did a great job putting them in position to make plays today," Narduzzi said. "It comes down to, `Is that going to be a catch at the end?"

Pittsburgh averaged 5.1 yards per carry even after losing 28 yards on a bad first-quarter snap, with James Conner among four players to rush for TDs. The Panthers held the Tar Heels to 18 yards rushing. The Panthers step out of ACC play to host Marshall in the first meeting between the schools next week.

Marshall

A once seemingly insurmountable four-touchdown lead gone against resilient Marshall on Saturday night, Pittsburgh could have played it safe and tried to hold on. Not this time. Up by just a field goal and facing third down near midfield, Pitt quarterback Nathan Peterman lobbed a deep ball to Jester Weah down the sideline. The junior wide receiver pulled it in over a defender and raced to the end zone for a 54-yard touchdown with 1:04 remaining and the Panthers pulled away late for a 43–27 win.

"I loved it when they called the play," Weah said. "I knew I had the ability to make the play. I just had to go out there and just do it." And help Pitt (3–2) avoid another late meltdown. Two weeks after giving up the go-ahead touchdown with 2:18 to play in a loss at Oklahoma State and seven days after a 13-point fourth-quarter lead turned into a last-second loss at North Carolina, the Panthers appeared in trouble again when Marshall's Keion Davis scored on a 1-yard run with 4:01 to play to pull the Thundering Herd (1–3) within 30–27.

After falling to the Tar Heels, Pitt coach Pat Narduzzi said his team couldn't afford to become predictable in late-game situations. Offensive coordinator Matt Canada was listening. Peterman hit Scott Orndoff on third down to extend the drive before Peterman's second touchdown of the game let the Panthers exhale. "The best thing is we made plays when we needed to at the end," Narduzzi said. Peterman finished with a season-high 280 yards passing and two scores. Weah caught seven passes for 176 yards and freshman Chawntez Moss ran for 97 yards. Pitt outgained the Thundering Herd 532–344. Still, it wasn't exactly easy. Marshall quarterback Chase Litton returned after missing a loss to Louisville last week and threw for 240 yards with two touchdowns and an interception. Michael Clark caught four passes for 147 yards, including an 83-yard touchdown as part of Marshall's methodical rally, one that hardly seemed possible after an opening 30 minutes in which Pitt did whatever it wanted.

Pitt entered the game with the 127th-ranked pass defense in the nation, next-to-last in the FBS. While Litton and Clark heated up in the second half, the Panthers got in the final word. Cornerback Avonte Maddox, picked on repeatedly by opponents over the last three weeks, returned a Litton pass 33 yards for a score on the game's final play. "Avonte Maddox needed that", Narduzzi said. Pitt gets back into ACC action when it hosts Georgia Tech next Saturday.

Georgia Tech

Another fourth-quarter lead gone and another "what if" loss looming, Pittsburgh responded with a little bit of savvy, luck and a dash of redemption for its beleaguered defense thrown in for good measure to surge past struggling Georgia Tech. First, Scott Orndoff kept his head while hauling in a tipped pass from Nate Peterman the tight end turned into a game-tying 74-yard touchdown with 3:50 to play. Then nose tackle Tyrique Jarrett stuffed Yellow Jackets running back Dedrick Mills on fourth down to give Pitt the ball back with 1:47 left to set up Chris Blewitt's bank shot 31-yard field goal as time expired. Just another heart-stopping Saturday for the Panthers. "I think it's just about believing and never getting down on yourself or on your team," Orndoff said. "Just hanging in there."

Something Pitt (4–2, 1–1 ACC) is getting used to under coach Pat Narduzzi. The outcome has hung in the balance in the final 2 minutes each of the last five weeks, including a last-second loss to North Carolina two weeks ago in which the Tar Heels converted four fourth-downs on the deciding drive.

That's what made Jarrett and linebacker Matt Galambos' stop so satisfying. The clock dwindling, Georgia Tech went for it on fourth-and-1 at its own 34 rather than kick it. Galombos—who Narduzzi describes as the defense's "computer"—sensed a dive play was coming and changed the call right before the snap, leading Jarrett to stand up Mills short of the first down. "I happened to guess right," Jarrett said. "It was perfect."

Pitt drove to the Georgia Tech 12 to set up Blewitt's winner, which smacked off the right upright and through as time expired. It's the second straight season Pitt topped the Yellow Jackets on a late kick by Blewitt, whose 52 career field goals are a school record. "Called corner pocket," Blewitt joked. Georgia Tech coach Paul Johnson defended the decision to go for it rather than kick it and give Pitt's offense, which punted just once all day, another shot. Instead, the Yellow Jackets (3–3, 1–3 ACC) dropped their third straight overall and their sixth straight true road game dating back to 2014.

"If I to do over again at the end of the game, I probably still would have gone for it but I would have called a different play," Johnson said. "I felt the way the game was going, I felt like we could make a half-yard and we didn't so that's on me. That's my responsibility and I'll take the blame for it." Peterman finished 14 of 20 for 192 yards and the long score to Orndoff. The Panthers spread the ball around while running for 215 yards, including a 24-yard run by 300-pound Pitt lineman Brian O'Neill on a designed throwback lateral. Pitt offensive coordinator Matt Canada installed the play this week specifically for O'Neill, a former tight end. He caught the ball and was surrounded by teammates while being escorted to the end zone.

"(Canada) told me don't do anything stupid when you score a touchdown because you're going to score a touchdown," O'Neill said. Pitt travels to Virginia to take on the Cavaliers. Each team has won on its home field in the series since the Panthers joined the ACC in 2013.

at Virginia

It was only one play in a game unfolding as a track meet, and it changed the game entirely. Jordan Whitehead, deep in coverage as Virginia was trying to push the issue and sneak in more points before halftime, stepped in front of Kurt Benkert's pass at the Panthers' 41 and never stopped running until Pittsburgh took a 35–28 lead over Virginia into halftime. "It was gigantic. It was gigantic," Panthers coach Pat Narduzzi said after the Panthers won 45–31 Saturday. "We've been waiting for one of those picks in that coverage and we finally got one. ... Tremendous football play by him and then he finds a way to get it in the end zone." The play capped a wild half that saw the teams combine for three touchdowns in one span of 63 seconds on a 44-yard scoring run by Virginia's Taquan Mizzell, a 93-yard kickoff return by Quadree Henderson and Benkert's 74-yard strike to Olamide Zaccheaus. But it left Cavaliers offensive coordinator Robert Anae accepting the blame for getting greedy in the final 33 seconds of the half. The drive began with 12-yard run by Mizzell to move the ball to the Cavaliers' 44. After a spike to stop the clock, Virginia had a receiver wide open on the next play, but Benkert was scrambling, so Anae called exactly the same play, hoping the same opportunity would develop. "It completely backfired on us," Anae said. "That was my fault all the way. I blew the call and put our quarterback in a bad situation." James Conner ran for 90 yards and two touchdowns and Pittsburgh shut Virginia down in the second half.

The Panthers (5–2, 2–1 ACC) held the Cavaliers without a completion in a scoreless third quarter, outgaining them 80–15, and limited them to 108 yards and a 36-yard field goal by Sam Hayward with 2:04 remaining. It was Hayward's first career 3-pointer. Virginia (2–4, 1–1 ACC) had its two-game winning streak end. Nathan Peterman threw two touchdown passes for Panthers, the last on a shovel pass to George Aston making it 42–28 with 9:47 left. The Panthers have scored at least 36 points in six consecutive games, a program record, so offense isn't a problem. Their run defense is statistically solid, but might be artificially so because its pass defense is spotty. Kurt Benkert thrived in the first half, when Pitt had no sacks, but the Cavaliers quarterback seemed rattled after the Panthers sacked him three times in four plays early after halftime. Whitehead isn't Pittsburgh's only two-way player anymore. The safety, who also carried the ball three times for 28 yards, was joined in that versatility by Conner, who took a few snaps at defensive end. "We've been kind of working that in and as you guys know, he was recruited as a defensive lineman," Narduzzi said. "... James is a super football player. I was happy he got a hurry on the quarterback and we'll have a little bit more of that." The Panthers have a bye next weekend, and will then play Virginia Tech at Heinz Field on Thursday night.

Virginia Tech

at Miami (FL)

at Clemson

Pittsburgh was happy to once again shuffle up the national championship picture. "Hey, sorry to do that. But we wanted this one bad," said Conner, who had two touchdowns and ran for 132 yards in the Panthers' 43–42 stunner over No. 2 Clemson on Saturday. Conner's 20 yard TD run with 5:17 left inched the Panthers into striking range and Chris Blewitt, after a kiss on the cheek from coach Pat Narduzzi, struck a perfect 48 yard field goal with six seconds left for the winning points. "We'll remember this one forever," Conner said. So, too, will Clemson (9–1, 6–1 Atlantic Coast Conference, No. 3 AP) which saw its run at perfection halted after escaping so many other jams this season. A fourth-down stop a yard shy saved the Tigers' 42–36 win over Louisville on Oct. 1. North Carolina State's missed field goal at the end of regulation boosted Clemson to a 24–17 overtime win. This time, it was the Panthers (6–4, 3–3) who made the critical plays. When Clemson was driving for a touchdown already up 42–34, linebacker Saleem Brightwell picked off quarterback Deshaun Watson, his third interception and returned it 70 yards to set up a 20-yard TD by Conner that drew Pitt within 42–40. When Clemson attempted to run out the clock, the Panthers defense (despite allowing 630 yards) stuffed Wayne Gallman a yard short on third and fourth downs to take over near midfield with 58 seconds left. "We had a chance to put the game away and they stopped us," Clemson coach Dabo Swinney said. "We had been making those kinds of plays this year."

Nathan Peterman moved Pitt to the Clemson 30 and Blewitt steadily knocked through. It was Pitt's highest-ranked win since defeating Backyard Brawl rival, No. 2 West Virginia, 13–9 in 2007 and spoiling the Mountaineers' chances at playing for the national title. "Our team had a lot of guts tonight," Narduzzi said. And a whole lot of playmakers to topple the defending ACC champs. Peterman had a career-best five TD passes and 308 yards. Conner rushed for 132 yards and a touchdown. He also caught one of Peterman's scoring throws. Blewitt, who had a kick blocked at the end of the opening half, was steely-eyed and ready. Narduzzi gave his senior a kiss on the cheek and sent him out for the winning kick. "As soon as I saw the kick go up, I knew it was going in," Scott Orndoff said. "It was jubilation." Clemson had its offense going. Watson threw for an ACC record 580 yards and three touchdowns. Gallman ran for three TDs and Mike Williams had 15 catches for 202 yards and a touchdown. In the end, it was Clemson's first loss to an unranked opponent in five seasons, a span of 46 games. "Come Monday, we'll start over because it's a long season," Watson said. "Get ready for Wake Forest. Hopefully, we can clinch the ACC (Atlantic) and punch our ticket" for the championship game next week.

Duke

Syracuse

The Panthers would play rival Syracuse in their season finale in a wild shootout at home. James Conner would rush for 115 yards with 2 TDs, while Nathan Peterman would only complete 9 passes, but 4 of them would go for touchdowns to go along with 251 passing yards and 1 rushing touchdown. Jester Weah finished the game with 4 reception for 99 yards and 2 TDs. Syracuse QB Zack Mahoney would complete 43 of 61 passes for 440 yards and 5 TDs, targeting a Pitt secondary that had been susceptible to giving up big plays all year; all 5 of his touchdown passes were caught by Senior WR Amba Etta-Tawo who, along with the 5 TD receptions, would finish with 13 total receptions with 178 yards receiving.

The two teams combined 1,312 yards and 137 points, breaking the record for most combined points in a game. The previous record was set by Navy and North Texas during a November 10, 2007 meeting between the two teams in which they combined for 136 points. The 76 points surrendered by the Syracuse defense was also the most points given up in program history.

Northwestern (Pinstripe Bowl)

Roster

Rankings

Coaching staff

Notes 

 69,983 fans attended the Pitt-Penn State game making it the largest attended sporting event.
 Pitt's 76-61 victory over Syracuse sets a new record for most combined points (137).

Team players drafted into the NFL

References

Pittsburgh
Pittsburgh Panthers football seasons
Pittsburgh Panthers football